A by-election was held for the Australian House of Representatives seat of Murray on 20 March 1971. This was triggered by the resignation of former Country Party leader and interim Prime Minister John McEwen.

The by-election was won by Country Party candidate Bruce Lloyd.

Results

References

1971 elections in Australia
Victorian federal by-elections
1970s in Victoria (Australia)
March 1971 events in Australia